The president of the Republic of Malawi is the head of state and head of government of Malawi. The president leads the executive branch of the Government of Malawi and is the commander-in-chief of the Malawian Defence Force.

Executive branch

Under the 1995 constitution, the president, who is both head of state and head of government, is chosen through universal direct suffrage every 5 years. Malawi has a vice president who is elected with the president. The president has the option of appointing a second vice president, who must be from a different party. It also includes a  presidentially appointed cabinet. The members of the cabinet of Malawi can be drawn from either within or outside of the legislature. 

The current President is Lazarus Chakwera sworn in as president of Malawi on 28th June 2020.

Origins of the Presidency

On 6 July 1964, Nyasaland became independent from British rule and renamed itself Malawi, with Elizabeth II as Queen of Malawi. Under a new constitution in 1966, Malawi became a republic with prime minister  Hastings Banda becoming its first president. Under the country's 1966, 1994 and 1995 constitutions, the president is executive head of state and government. The first president was elected by the National Assembly, but later presidents were elected in direct popular elections for a five-year term.

Election to the Presidency

The president is elected by a majority vote (50% + 1) of the electorate through direct, universal and equal suffrage. All Malawian citizens that have attained the age of 18 are eligible to vote in all elections. Every presidential candidate shall declare who shall be the Vice-President if elected at the time of the candidate's nomination. The Vice-President shall be elected concurrently with the President, with both names on the ballot.

List of presidents

Latest election

See also
List of colonial heads of Malawi (Nyasaland)
List of Governors-General of Malawi
List of heads of state of Malawi
List of heads of government of Malawi
Lists of incumbents

References

Malawi
 
1966 establishments in Malawi